Alexander Cunningham (1814–1893) was a British archaeologist and the father of the Archaeological Survey of India.

Alexander Cunningham is also the name of:

Alexander Cunningham, 1st Earl of Glencairn (1426–1488), Scottish nobleman
Alexander Cunningham, 5th Earl of Glencairn (died 1574), Scottish nobleman and covenanter
Alexander Cunningham (jurist) (1655–1730), academic and chess player, often confused with the historian
Alexander Cunningham (historian) (1655–1737), Scottish diplomat
Alexander Cunningham (rower) (born 1936), Australian Olympic rower
Alex Cunningham (born 1955), UK MP
W. A. Cunningham (1886–1958), American football coach
Alexander Cunningham (priest) (died 1660), English Anglican priest in Ireland
Alexander Cunningham (lawyer), one of Robert Burns's closest friends